James King (born 1855 – date of death unknown), also possibly known as John King, was an English professional cricketer who played in three first-class cricket matches between 1881 and 1882.

King was born at Southampton in Hampshire in 1855. He played twice in first-class matches for Kent County Cricket Club in 1881 against MCC and Derbyshire before playing once the following year for Hampshire against Somerset.

There is some doubt that the same man played for both Kent and Hampshire, and very little is known about King's life. It is possible that he was a carpenter and lived at Tonbridge in Kent with his wife, who was born in the town, at the 1881 Census. His date of death is unknown.

References

External links

1855 births
Cricketers from Southampton
English cricketers
Kent cricketers
Hampshire cricketers
Year of death missing